
Korangi Zoo established in 1990, is a zoological garden located at Korangi, Landhi Town, Karachi District, Sindh, Pakistan. The zoo operates under the City District Government Karachi and is a member of SAZARC.

In 2006, 4 million Pakistani rupees were allocated to the Landhi Korangi Zoo for bringing new animals particularly a pair of lions. The management of Karachi Zoo also provided two pairs of plains zebra, one male and two female of the red-necked wallaby, one pair of Arabian oryx and two pairs of ostrich.

Landhi Korangi Aquarium
In November 2004, construction plans for an aquarium, that had been on hold since 1992, were approved by nazim of the city. In June 2012, administrator of KMC, Muhammad Hussain Syed, told The Nation that the construction was going on speedily inside the Landhi Korangi Zoo. On September 18, 2012, Ishrat-ul-Ibad Khan, the Governor of Sindh, later inaugurated the Landhi Korangi Aquarium as the biggest aquarium in Pakistan to date.

Further reading
Ilyas, Faiza (December 15, 2008). "KARACHI: Harassed leopard forced to live in poor conditions". dawn.com. DAWN News. Retrieved September 13, 2010.
Dawn Editorial (March 9, 2010). "Cruelty in zoos". dawn.com. DAWN News. Retrieved September 17, 2010.

References

External links
Landhi Zoo Up-gradation
Map location at paktive.com

Parks in Karachi
Zoos in Pakistan
Landhi Town